Dave Anderson may refer to:

Dave Anderson (actor) (born 1945), Scottish actor, playwright and jazz musician
Dave Anderson (alpine skier) (born 1979), Canadian former alpine skier
 Dave Anderson (boxer) (born 1965), British boxer
Dave Anderson (cartoon writer) (born 1963), creator of Bastard Bunny and Bafta nominee for The Terribles
Dave Anderson (footballer) (born 1962), football manager, former player and media personality from Northern Ireland
Dave Anderson (infielder) (born 1960), former Major League Baseball shortstop/third baseman
Dave Anderson (musician), bassist, member of Amon Düül II, Hawkwind and Space Ritual
Dave Anderson (pitcher) (1868–1897), Major League Baseball pitcher
Dave Anderson (sportswriter) (1929–2018), American sportswriter

See also
David Anderson (disambiguation)
Dave Anderson (singer/songwriter and tech marketer) (born 1979), Australian singer/songwriter and tech marketer